The 2014 Giro di Lombardia or 2014 Il Lombardia was the 108th edition of the Giro di Lombardia single-day cycling race, often known as the Race of the Falling Leaves. It was held on 5 October 2014 over a distance of 254 km. The course was different from years past, and it finished in Bergamo. The race was won by Daniel Martin ahead of Alejandro Valverde and Rui Costa.

Results

References

External links
 

2014 UCI World Tour
2014 Giro di Lombardia
2014 in Italian sport